Miculek is a surname.

People by this name include:

 Jerry Miculek (born 1954) U.S. competition shooter
 Kay Clark-Miculek, U.S. competition shooter
 Lena Miculek (born 1995) U.S. competition shooter

See also